The Bucharest World Trade Center is a business centre in Bucharest, Romania. Among other things, it houses the headquarters of Michelin Romania, ABN AMRO Bank as well as Pullman Hotel Bucharest.

References

Hotels in Bucharest
World Trade Centers